Cheers is the debut studio album by American rapper Obie Trice. It was released on September 23, 2003 by Shady Records and Interscope Records. Eminem served as the executive producer for this album. This album serves as his first release from Shady Records since being signed in 2000. The album was certified Gold by the RIAA.

Recording and production
The album was recorded between 2002 and 2003, since being signed to Shady Records in 2000. The standard edition of the album consisted of seventeen tracks; Eminem served as executive producer and handled most of the audio production by himself. Additional audio production was provided by Denaun Porter, Dr. Dre, Emile, Fredwreck, Jeff Bass, Luis Resto, Mike Elizondo and Timbaland. The bonus tracks "8 Miles" and "Synopsis" had their audio production handled by DJ Green Lantern and DJ Muggs, respectively.
Featured artists on Cheers include Eminem, Nate Dogg, Timbaland, Lloyd Banks, 50 Cent, Dr. Dre, D12 and Busta Rhymes.

Content
The title track celebrates Obie's successful debut into the rap game after being in the Detroit underground for many years. Topics Obie has touched on this album include his life on the streets of Detroit, problems with his mother, relationships with women and the soulful reminder that, despite having made it into the mainstream, he has not forgotten his friends.

Diss songs
"Shit Hits the Fan"
The track "Shit Hits the Fan" is a track which insults Ja Rule. Examples of disses from Dr. Dre in the track are: "This little nigga, Ja Rule, Talking bout he's gonna slap me, Nigga please, you gotta jump and swing up to hit me at the knees." At the end of the song, Obie spoke over the beat telling Ja Rule to, "Go behind all the gangsta's you want. Matter of fact get every gangsta from every hood in the United States of America to back you. Ain't nobody reppin' with you, you can't see that?" This was intended to mock Ja Rule's street credibility, declaring that no one was backing him again and that he "fell off."

"We All Die One Day"
The track "We All Die One Day" is a diss to Benzino and The Source. Examples from Lloyd Banks include a subliminal shot at Ja Rule and Irv Gotti like, 'Your boss and your captain soft'. Eminem dissed The Source with lines like, 'We burn Source covers like fuckin' Cypress Hill'.

"Outro"
The track "Outro", which features D12 in the song, was a diss to Murder Inc. Records and Benzino.

Artwork and packaging
The album's title is a homage to the long running NBC sitcom of the same name, and the album cover features a logo similar to that used on the show.

Reception

Commercial
The album debuted at number five on the Billboard 200 and number three on the Top R&B/Hip-Hop Albums with 226,000 copies sold in its first week. It went on to be certified Gold in Australia, New Zealand, the United Kingdom and  has been certified platinum in the United States for selling over 1.5 million copies, and worldwide sales of 2 million copies.

Critical

Cheers garnered generally positive reviews from music critics. At Metacritic, which assigns a normalized rating out of 100 to reviews from mainstream critics, the album received an average score of 73, based on 12 reviews, which indicates "generally favorable reviews".

AllMusic's Jason Birchmeier said, "Cheers boasts 74 straight minutes of inventive production, original ideas, thought-out lyrics, and straight-up MCing -- even if it lacks outright hits like "In da Club" or "Lose Yourself." So cheers, indeed -- to Trice, that is -- because his debut is quite an accomplishment and deserves accolade, even if it's not a commercial juggernaut like its fellow Shady releases." J-23 of HipHopDX praised the production from Dr. Dre, Timbaland and Eminem, Obie's "raw and abrasive" delivery having "flawless execution" and working well alongside the guest artists that help elevate the record despite being unnecessary at points, concluding that: "Nevertheless, Cheers needs to be saluted. [It is] an excellent debut for Obie and he finds a great balance of radio friendly raps and hardcore hip-hop. While he isn't going to move 50 numbers, Cheers is the superior album. I'll drink to that." Melisa Tang of The Situation also gave praise to the beats for giving support to Obie's "skillful and witty flow" throughout the track listing but felt they only work half the time, concluding that: "Overall, Obie Trice has not failed to deliver. There is no doubt that he has the talent to succeed in the rap game, but the real test will be in winning over the haters, who constantly accuse him of riding on Eminem's phenomenal worldwide success." Jon Caramanica, writing for Rolling Stone, commended Obie for utilizing his "workmanlike emphasis of craft over style" when delivering humorous tracks like "Hoodrats" and "Got Some Teeth" but was more interested in his vitriol side on "Shit Hits the Fan" and "We All Die One Day", saying they "distract from his otherwise almost demure display of skill." PopMatters contributor Cynthia Fuchs felt the record was overlong and repetitive with its "misogynistic malice" and "hood life" indulgence but gave credit to tracks like "Oh!" and "The Set Up" for telling significant street tales and "Don't Come Down" and "Follow My Life" for being "compelling" tributes dedicated to Obie's mother.

Track listing

Notes
 signifies an additional producer.
 signifies a co-producer.

Sample credits
"Got Some Teeth" contains resung elements from "Without Me" by Eminem
"Don't Come Down" samples from "When You Believe" by Quincy Jones and Táta Vega
"Follow My Life" samples from "Big Poppa" by Notorious B.I.G.
"Spread Yo Shit" samples from "Blow My Buzz" by D12
"Outro" contains resung elements from "When the Music Stops" by D12

Personnel
Adapted from the Cheers liner notes.
Instrumentation
Jeff Bass – guitar 
Mike Dinkins – bass guitar 
Mike Elizondo – keyboards 
Fredwreck – guitar, keyboards 
Steve King – guitar , bass guitar 
Luis Resto – bass guitar , keyboards 

Technical
Mike Strange – engineering 
Mauricio "Veto" Iragorri – engineering 
Jimmy Douglas – engineering, mixing 
Steve King – engineering , mixing 
Rich Hunt – engineering , assistant engineer 
Demacio Castellon – assistant engineer 
Rouble Kapoor – assistant engineer 
Dr. Dre – mixing 
Eminem – mixing 
Timbaland – mixing 
Brian Gardner – mastering

Imagery
Slang Inc. – art direction and design
Jonathan Mannion – photography

Charts

Weekly charts

Year-end charts

Certifications

References

2003 debut albums
Obie Trice albums
Shady Records albums
Albums produced by Dr. Dre
Albums produced by Eminem
Albums produced by Emile Haynie
Albums produced by Fredwreck
Albums produced by Timbaland
Albums produced by Mr. Porter
Albums produced by Mike Elizondo